St George's Fields was an area of Southwark

St George's Fields may also refer to:

St George's Fields, Westminster, former cemetery in Bayswater
Woodhouse Cemetery or St George's Fields, former cemetery in Leeds